The 2007–08 Leyton Orient F.C. season was the 109th season in the history of Leyton Orient Football Club, their 92nd in the Football League, and second consecutive season in the third tier of the English football league system.

Season summary 
Having finished in 20th place, one spot above the relegation zone, most of the side that won the club promotion in 2006 left at the end of the season. Some players were released, some declined new contracts and the club's longest-serving player Matthew Lockwood was re-signed but later moved in pre-season to Nottingham Forest. The O's began the 2007-08 season in fine form, winning seven of their first nine games in all competitions. Orient were top of the table at the beginning of October and were in the top seven until after Christmas, though a loss of form in the second half of the season, recording only three wins from the last 12 games, meant the season ended in a respectable 14th placed finish with 60 points.

League table

Results

Football League One

FA Cup

League Cup

Football League Trophy

Squad

References 

Leyton Orient F.C. seasons
Leyton Orient